The Rucker House is a historic residence in Ruckersville, Georgia. It was added to the National Register of Historic Places on June 23, 1978. It is located on GA 985. Joseph Rucker (January 12, 1788 - ) was a large landholder and slaver. He died shortly after the American Civil War. His family established Ruckersville, Virginia and Ruckersville, Georgia.

See also
National Register of Historic Places listings in Elbert County, Georgia

References

Houses on the National Register of Historic Places in Georgia (U.S. state)
Houses in Elbert County, Georgia
National Register of Historic Places in Elbert County, Georgia
Houses completed in 1815